Roxy the Soundtrack is the CD companion released in the Roxy: The Movie, DVD/CD and Blu-ray/CD sets.  The CD soundtrack is not sold separately.

Background
The film used to produce the movie was shot in 1973 using four cameras at five live shows performed on December 8, 9 and 10 (early and late shows on the 9th and 10th).  What wasn't known at the time was due to a malfunction the audio and video were recorded out of sync.  As John Albanian discusses in the liner notes, the problem was such that not until today's technology could the issue be painstakingly resolved.

This is the third time around for the music from the Roxy shows.  In 1974 Roxy & Elsewhere released some of the tracks from these shows and a few others.  Then the 2014 Roxy by Proxy release made available more tracks exclusively from the December dates and all different from any on the previous release.  This release represents those used in the movie, except tracks 8, 13, 14 & 16.

Track listing
All songs composed by Frank Zappa

Personnel 
Frank Zappa - lead guitar, vocals, percussion
Ruth Underwood - percussion
Ralph Humphrey - drums, percussion
George Duke - keyboards, synthesizer, vocals
Tom Fowler - bass
Bruce Fowler - trombone, dancing (?) 
Napoleon Murphy Brock - tenor sax, flute, lead vocals
Chester Thompson - drums

Sources 
A little over 21 hours of picture and sound shot in December 1973

References

External links

Frank Zappa albums
2015 albums
Albums published posthumously